Sharon Gal (born 13 August 1974) is an Israeli journalist and politician. He served as a member of the Knesset for Yisrael Beiteinu during 2015.

Biography
Gal was born in Tirat Carmel. He hosted an economics program ('Economic Night') on Channel 10 until he resigned due to allegations of sexual harassment in 2010. The case was dropped due to lack of evidence. After his resignation, Gal became a radio show host. In summer 2014, Gal interviewed MK Haneen Zoabi on his radio show following the kidnapping of three Israeli teenagers in the West Bank. Zoabi said on the show that she did not believe the kidnappers were terrorists.

In 2019 he started hosting the TV show "Sharon and Rani LTD" along with Rani Rahav.

Political career
In January 2015, Gal was placed fifth on the Yisrael Beiteinu list for the 2015 Knesset elections,
 and was elected to the Knesset as the party won six seats. However, in September 2015, Gal chose to leave the Knesset after only six months in office, deciding instead to focus on journalism. He was replaced by Oded Forer.

References

External links

Living people
1974 births
Israeli Jews
People from Tirat Carmel
Israeli television journalists
Israeli radio journalists
Yisrael Beiteinu politicians
Members of the 20th Knesset (2015–2019)
Israeli people of Libyan-Jewish descent
Israeli people of Egyptian-Jewish descent
Big Brother (franchise) contestants